The Little and Large Show was a sketch comedy series broadcast on BBC1 between 1 May 1978 and 20 April 1991. Its first series was entitled just Little and Large.

Transmissions

Series

Specials

References

External links

1978 British television series debuts
1991 British television series endings
1970s British television sketch shows
1980s British television sketch shows
1990s British television sketch shows
BBC television comedy
BBC Television shows
English-language television shows